Coombe Girls' School is an all-girls secondary school and co-educational sixth form with academy status in New Malden, South-West London, England. The school is a Leading Edge School, a Training School and specialises in languages. The school and nearby Coombe Boys' School are known jointly as The Coombe Federation.

History
Coombe Girls' School, formerly called Coombe County Secondary School for Girls, was established in 1955, and has remained an all-girls school ever since. The school is federated with Coombe Boys School.

In September 2012 the school had a new headteacher, Mrs Walls, who succeeded Mrs Campbell. Since then, the school has seen Ms Barnes as Headteacher.

School inspections

As of 2023, the school's most recent inspection by Ofsted was in 2013, with a judgement of Outstanding.

Houses
The school sorts the pupils into house tutor groups. Citizenship is taught in these groups.  These are named after seven of the planets in the solar system and one constellation.

Each group has a form tutor who will be with the class for registration before school and before fifth period. This tutor will stay with their class, unless they leave the school, for the whole five years in which the girls are pupils of the school.

Up to Year 9, subjects apart from Maths, Science and Technology are taught in Teaching Groups.

Exam results
Coombe Girls' School's overall exam results ranked in the top 20% of similar schools' results, and in the top 20% of all schools, for 2013.

The Federation was named one of the best state secondary schools in the country in Tatler magazine's 2015 State Schools Guide.

In 2016 the school received a letter from Nick Gibb MP congratulating the school on being in the top 100 non selective state-funded schools for the percentage of pupils attaining 5 GCSEs at A* to C with English and Mathematics, for the percentage achieving the English Baccalaureate and for the school's key stage 2 to key stage 4 value added figure.

Notable former pupils
 Jacqueline Wilson, author
 Sandy Denny, singer
 Penny Spencer, actress best-known for playing Sharon in the first three series of the ITV school sitcom Please Sir!.

References

External links
School Website
Ofsted school data dashboard

Training schools in England
Girls' schools in London
Academies in the Royal Borough of Kingston upon Thames
Educational institutions established in 1955
1955 establishments in England
Secondary schools in the Royal Borough of Kingston upon Thames
New Malden